Latitudinarianism, in at least one area of contemporary philosophy, is a position concerning de dicto and de re (propositional)  attitudes.  Latitudinarians think that de re attitudes are not a category distinct from de dicto attitudes; the former are just a special case of the latter.

The term was introduced into discussions of de dicto and de re attitudes by Roderick Chisholm in his "Knowledge and Belief: 'De Dicto' and 'De Re'" (1976). Latitudinarianism has since also sometimes been called an "unrestricted exportation" view.

References and further reading
 Baker, Lynne Rudder (1982). "De Re Belief in Action" The Philosophical Review, Vol. 91, No. 3, pp. 363–387.
 Chisholm, Roderick (1976). "Knowledge and Belief: 'De Dicto' and 'De Re'" Philosophical Studies 29, pp. 1-20.
 Quine, W.V. (1956). "Quantifiers and Propositional Attitudes" Journal of Philosophy 53.  Reprinted in Quine's Ways of Paradox (1976), pp. 185–196.
 Sosa, Ernest (1995). "Fregean Reference Defended" Philosophical Issues, Vol. 6, Content, pp. 91–99.

Epistemological theories